Liam Geoffrey Gibbs (born 16 December 2002) is an English professional footballer who plays as a midfielder for EFL Championship club Norwich City.

Club career

Ipswich Town
Gibbs joined the Ipswich Town academy in 2011, progressing through the club's youth system and captaining the club's youth sides at under-15 and under-16 levels. He signed a scholarship in 2018. He made his first-team debut for the club on 12 November 2019, appearing as a second-half substitute in a 0–1 away loss to Colchester United in an EFL Trophy group stage match. On 16 December, Gibbs signed his first professional contract with the club, signing an 18-month deal.

Norwich City
On 23 July 2021, Gibbs joined rival side Norwich City for an undisclosed fee, signing a four-year deal.

Career statistics

References

External links

Living people
Sportspeople from Bury St Edmunds
English footballers
Association football midfielders
Ipswich Town F.C. players
2002 births
English Football League players